Siti Hydroelectric Power Station may refer to one of the following:

 Siti I Hydroelectric Power Station, a  hydroelectric power station in Uganda
 Siti II Hydroelectric Power Station, a  hydroelectric power station in Uganda